Germagno is a comune (municipality) in the Province of Verbano-Cusio-Ossola in the Italian region Piedmont, located about  northeast of Turin and about  west of Verbania.

Germagno borders the following municipalities: Casale Corte Cerro, Loreglia, Omegna, Quarna Sopra.

References

External links
 Official website

Cities and towns in Piedmont